Joseph Newman Clinton (November 19, 1854 – 1927) was a politician and public official in Florida. An African American, he served in the Florida House of Representatives from Alachua County from 1881 to 1883, was a member of the city council in Gainesville from 1883 to 1885, and was a federal official in Pensacola and Tampa.

He was born in Pittsburgh, Pennsylvania, the son of an African Methodist Episcopal Church bishop. He went to high school at the Institute for Colored Youth and graduated from Lincoln University in 1873. He began his career as a teacher.  He married Agnes Stewart of Atlantic City in 1882.

For 14 years he served as internal revenue collector in Tampa. In 1913, Woodrow Wilson removed African Americans in the South from federal offices.

See also
African-American officeholders during the Reconstruction era

References

1854 births
1927 deaths
African Americans in Florida
People from Pittsburgh
Members of the Florida House of Representatives
People from Gainesville, Florida
Lincoln University (Pennsylvania) alumni